Makoto Okazaki may refer to:

Makoto Okazaki (figure skater), Japanese figure skater
Makoto Okazaki (footballer), Japanese footballer